Cabuçu is a neighbourhood in the city of Itaboraí, Rio de Janeiro Brazil. It is part of the 6th district along with Curuzu and São José.

It is a typical rural district, with small and medium farms. It borders the neighborhoods of São José, Badureco and Largo da Idéia, the latter being part of the municipality of São Gonçalo.

Most of its population is religious (especially evangelicals), so the neighborhood has many churches, a total of 25 churches, the most important being the chapel of Nossa Senhora Aparecida located next to the DPO (Detachment Policing Ostensibly Cabuçu) that makes the neighborhood processions every year on October 12 (Day of Our Lady Aparecida). Another important church in the neighborhood is the Evangelical Congregational Church located in an area farther from the shopping district.

Sanitation
The neighborhood has many problems related to sanitation. The main one is the lack of running water that used to be distributed by the licensee Univerde. Because of the lack of payment, water distribution was suspended for half of the neighborhood, thus the residents are mostly helped with water trucks.

Streets and Transportation

Most neighborhood streets are unpaved and the few that are paved are potholed, Spotlight on the road that links the idea of Largo Cabuçu (Currency with the municipality of São Gonçalo) which has no pavement and is very poor from start to finish in the locality known as Boi buffalo (as the locals say that there were many buffaloes in the village). The best way the neighborhood and most important is the Alderman Road Cicero Antonio de Souza, (popularly known as Cabuçu Road) linking the center of Itaboraí the neighborhood.

Transport in the neighborhood is done by the Transportation Rio Ita, and most of the buses are in poor condition, completely uncomfortable and dirty. The delay in such transport is also very large, which affect the residents of this neighborhood that most work in Niterói and São Gonçalo

Leisure & Recreation

The more traditional entertainment district is the naked football on Sundays between teams in the region, including the traditional and oldest amateur football team of the district (United States of Worcester), founded in 1992 by amateur players Jorge Roberto de Freitas, Sebastian Cabral, Anderson Fernandes and Marcio Cordeiro Felizardo.

Subdivisions

The district Cabuçu is divided into 6 parts: Tatiana Vila, Vila Verde, Vila Verde II, Youth, Largo de São Sebastião and Santo Mé. In the Largo de São Sebastião was shot in 2007 the show on Rede Globo Heavy Load, because the old buildings that are in place and the church of San Sebastian that was the scene of a staged marriage to actor junino Antônio Fagundes, the region is also marked by lots of greenery, farms and sites that triggered the episode title to (Formula headless).

Economic activities

The main economic activities of the area is livestock, the cultivation of fruits and vegetables.

Neighbourhoods in Rio de Janeiro (state)